The Kaikadi is a breed of sighthound from India. The Kaikadi are kept by the Kaikadi people, a nomadic tribe in Maharashtra and parts of Gujarat. They have long, thin legs and powerful thighs and hock joints, a long tapered tail, a long, thin head with prominent eyes, and erect ears. Their short coat comes in a variety of colours, but white, tan and black are predominant.

The Kaikadi are known for their exceptional speed. They usually hunt in packs for a variety of small game, particularly monkeys, rats, monitor lizards, mongoose and squirrels. The breed is suspicious of strangers, and at night they work as watchdogs for their masters.

See also
 Dogs portal
 List of dog breeds
 List of dog breeds from India

References

Dog breeds originating in India
Sighthounds

de:Kakadu